Zoo Tycoon 2 DS is a Nintendo DS game based on the PC game Zoo Tycoon 2. It is the sequel to Zoo Tycoon DS.

Gameplay
In Zoo Tycoon 2 DS, the player edits and builds the zoo in a main mode resembling the original Zoo Tycoon. Zookeeper mode is more like Zoo Tycoon 2 graphics-wise and has five mini-games: petting, cleaning animal waste, feeding, washing, and healing animals.

Reception
Zoo Tycoon 2 DS received better reviews than its predecessor Zoo Tycoon DS, but nevertheless reception for the game was still mixed, with GameRankings and Metacritic reporting an average of 65.32% and 60/100 respectively. Randolph Ramsey, reviewing the game for GameSpot, criticized the simplistic gameplay, complaining that it had been "stripped of any complexity that you can literally use the same strategy for making all your critters happy regardless of their size, rarity, or temperament." although he did praise the game for including "comprehensive details about all the animals featured on its roster for any curious kiddies". Jack DeVries of IGN also detested the lack of challenge in the game. PocketGamer's Rob Hearn felt that it was "difficult to get excited about" the game, and he disproved of Zoo Tycoon 2 DS's "uncooperative" interface. All three reviewers were also unimpressed by the game's graphics with Ramsey calling the animal models "uniformly poor" and DeVries calling the game "not very pleasant on the eyes".

References

External links
Zoo Tycoon 2 DS at GameSpot
Zoo Tycoon 2 DS at IGN

2008 video games
Altron games
Nintendo DS games
Nintendo DS-only games
THQ games
Video game sequels
Video games developed in Japan
Zoo Tycoon